The Caribbean Netherlands requires its residents to register their motor vehicles and display vehicle registration plates. Current plates are North American standard 6 × 12 inches (152 × 300 mm).

Passenger plates 
Plates with the large letter "B" indicate a plate from Bonaire, while the large letter "E" indicates a plate from St. Eustatius, and a large letter "S" indicates a plate from Saba. For plates with different letters see the Non-passenger baseplate section below.

Non-passenger plates

Some plates start with different letters, sometimes similar to plates of the Netherlands: AB for buses; BF for moped; D for government; H for rental car; MF for motorcycle; TX for taxi; V for trucks and commercial vehicles; and Z for heavy equipment.

References

Caribbean Netherlands
Transport in the Dutch Caribbean
Dutch Caribbean-related lists